Endeavour Group Ltd (EG) is an Australian alcoholic drinks retailer, hotel operator, and poker machine operator that was spun off from Woolworths Group in 2021.

History
In 2019, Woolworths restructured its alcoholic drinks business to form Endeavour Group. In June 2021, the Endeavour Group was listed as a separate entity on the Australian Securities Exchange.

Subsidiaries
Subsidiaries include:
Australian Leisure and Hospitality Group
Australian National Hotel, Brisbane
Breakfast Creek Hotel, Brisbane
Hotel Cecil, Gold Coast
Royal Exchange Hotel, Brisbane
Sail and Anchor Hotel, Fremantle
Surfers Paradise Beer Garden, Gold Coast
Victory Hotel, Brisbane
Young & Jackson, Melbourne
BWS
Cellarmasters
Dan Murphy's
Jimmy Brings
Langton's
Paragon Wine Estates
Pinnacle Drinks
Pinnacle Drinks
1495 Scotch Whisky
Arc Valley Beer
Buckeye Rum
Castaway Cider
Cocolada Liqueur
Feeney's Liqueur
Finnlaighs Whisky (other)
Houndstooth Gin
Island Fever Seltzer
John Boston Beer
Liberty Coast Seltzer
Loud & Proud Beer
Loud & Proud Seltzer
McAllister Scotch Whisky
Mishka Premix Spirits
Mishka Vodka
Nelson County Premix Spirits
Nelson County Bourbon
Rainbird Seltzer
Rey Loco Premix Spirits
Rollins Whisky (other)
Sail & Anchor Beer
Saintly Seltzer
Saxton Cider
Steersman Beer
Substation No. 41 Rum
Substation No. 41 Premix Spirits
Tequila 125 Tequila
Tun Beer
Windsor Gin
Shorty's Liquor

Paragon Wine Estates 
Paragon Wine Estates, Endeavour's premium wine portfolio, was established in September 2019 to house existing Endeavour brands Krondorf, Isabel Estate, Riddoch and the newly-acquired Chapel Hill. Paragon acquired Yarra Valley winery Oakridge Wines in March 2021, Tasmanian winery Josef Chromy Wines in May 2022, McLaren Vale's Shingleback Wine in August 2022, and Margaret River winery Cape Mentelle Vineyards in January 2023.

References

Alcohol distribution retailers in Australia
Companies based in Sydney
Companies listed on the Australian Securities Exchange
Drink companies of Australia
Retail companies established in 2019
Woolworths Group (Australia)
2019 establishments in Australia
Australian companies established in 2019